"The Last Time" is the first single from Agnetha Fältskog's third English solo-album I Stand Alone, released in 1987. "The Last Time" was released as both 7 and 12 inch singles, as well as a 3-inch CD. The latter two also featured an extended version of the song.

The song contained a different sound from Fältskog's previous work due to the West Coast American influences of the producers, Peter Cetera and Bruce Gaitsch. Despite a modern sound and a well-known producer, the single was not a resounding success. Fältskog did promote the song, including visiting London in February 1988, but the single only reached No.77 in the UK. In The Netherlands, where Fältskog traditionally had a large fan base, the single peaked at No. 18.

For the South American market, Fältskog recorded a Spanish version of "The Last Time" called "La Última Vez".  This version also appeared on the South American version of the album and is considered to be a rare recording.

In 1993 Mark Free covered this song and it is on his album Long Way From Love.

Formats and track listings
7"-single
 "The Last Time" [Album-Version] 4:15
 "Are You Gonna Throw It All Away" 4:55

12"-single/3"-CD-single
 "The Last Time" [Extended Version] 6:52
 "The Last Time" [Album-Version] 4:12
 "Are You Gonna Throw It All Away" 4:55

Charts

External links
"The Last Time" Official Agnetha Fältskog website.

References

1987 singles
Agnetha Fältskog songs
1987 songs
Warner Music Group singles